Sheep's milk (or ewes' milk) is the milk of domestic sheep. It is commonly used to make cultured dairy products such as cheese. Some of the most popular sheep cheeses include feta (Greece), ricotta (Italy), and Roquefort (France).

Sheep breeds
Specialized dairy breeds of sheep yield more milk than other breeds. Common dairy breeds include:
 East Friesian (Germany) 
 Sarda (Italy)
 Lacaune (France)
 British Milk Sheep (UK)
 Chios (Greece)
 Awassi (Syria)
 Assaf (Israel)
 Zwartbles (Friesland, Netherlands) 
In the U.S., the most common dairy breeds are the East Friesian and the Lacaune. Meat or wool breeds do not produce as much milk as dairy breeds, but may produce enough for small amounts of cheese and other products.

Milk production period
Female sheep (ewes) do not produce milk constantly. Rather, they produce milk during the 80–100 days after lambing. Sheep naturally breed in the fall, which means that a majority of lambs are born in the winter or early spring. Milk production decreases and eventually stops when lambs are weaned or when the days become shorter.  This means that milk cannot be produced year round. Through the use of controlled internal drug release (CIDR), ewes can be bred out of season. CIDR drugs contain progesterone, which is slowly released into the bloodstream, bringing the animal into estrus. In this way, ewes can be bred at different times throughout the year, providing farms with a year-round supply of milk.

Meat and wool breeds of sheep lactate for 90–150 days, while dairy breeds can lactate for 120–240 days. Dairy sheep are able to produce higher yields of milk per ewe per year. Dairy sheep can produce  of milk per year while other sheep produce  of milk per year. Crossbred ewes produce  of milk per year.

Products made from sheep milk
Sheep milk cheeses include the feta of Greece, Roquefort of France, Manchego of Spain; Serra da Estrela from Portugal; pecorino Romano (the Italian word for sheep is pecora), pecorino Sardo, and ricotta of Italy; Pag cheese of Croatia; Ġbejna of Malta; and Gomolya of Hungary; and Bryndza (Slovenská bryndza from Slovakia, brânza de burduf from Romania and Bryndza Podhalańska from Poland).

In Greece, yogurt is often made from sheep's milk.

Nutrition by comparison 
Milk composition analysis, per 100 grams:

{| class="wikitable" style="text-align:center"
|-
! Constituents
! unit
! Cow
! Goat
! Water buffalo
! Sheep
|-
| Water
| g
| 87.8
| 88.9
| 81.1
| 83.0
|-
| Protein
| g
| 3.2
| 3.1
| 4.5
| 5.4
|-
| Fat
| g
| 3.9
| 3.5
| 8.0
| 7.0
|-
| Carbohydrate
| g
| 4.8
| 4.4
| 4.9
| 5.1
|-
| Energy
| kcal
| 66
| 60
| 110
| 95
|-
| 
| kJ
| 275
| 253
| 463
| 396
|-
| Sugars (Lactose)
| g
| 4.8
| 4.4
| 5.1
| 4.9
|-
| Saturated
| g
| 2.4
| 2.3
| 4.2
| 3.8
|-
| Mono-unsaturated
| g
| 1.1
| 0.8
| 1.7
| 1.5
|-
| Polyunsaturated
| g
| 0.1
| 0.1
| 0.2
| 0.3
|-
| Cholesterol
| mg
| 14
| 10
| 8
| 11
|-
| Calcium
| IU
| 120
| 100
| 195
| 170
|-
| Fatty Acids:
|}
Sheep milk is extremely high in fat and conjugated linoleic acid (CLA) and has a high level of solids, as compared to other milks. This makes it very suitable for cheese-making. In particular, sheep's milk produces much more cheese than the same amount of cow's milk.

See also 
 Donkey milk
 Goat milk
 Mare milk
 Moose milk
 List of dairy products
 List of sheep milk cheeses
 Sheep farming

References

External links
 Sheep dairying at sheep101.com
 Sheep dairying documentary by Cooking Up A Story

Milk by animal
Dairy farming
Sheep's-milk cheeses